The women's road race cycling event at the 2019 European Games in Minsk took place on 22 June.

Results

References

Women's road race